Queensland Health is the name of the overall public health service in the state of Queensland, Australia. Like all other states and territories in Australia, the Queensland Government provides low-  or no-cost primary, secondary, and tertiary health services to eligible citizens, residents and visitors through general government taxation and Medicare.

Queensland Health is formed of the Department of Health and 16 Hospital and Health Services (HHS'). Each HHS covers a certain geographical region of Queensland, with the exception of the state-wide paediatric specialty service, Children's Health Queensland. The Department of Health is responsible for management and performance of the system, and HHS support services like centralised supply and procurement, HR, and IT services. Most HHS' also have associated foundations and authorities, which provide additional financial and promotional support.

Across the entire network, Queensland Health employs over 97,000 staff and has an annual operating budget of almost AU$30 billion. At the end of June 2014, there were 11,109 inpatient beds available across all state hospitals. There are 305 routinely available intensive care beds within the public system, with up to 950 available across the public and private system if needed. All HHS have existing contracts with private sector hospitals to be able to access these beds in an emergency.

On 1 January 1946, Queensland became the first state in Australia to introduce free universal public hospital treatment, a policy later adopted by other jurisdictions. Created in 1975, Medicare gives Australian citizens and permanent residents access to low or no-cost health services, including doctors, nurse practitioners, medications (through the Pharmaceutical Benefits Scheme), and some allied health, in both the public and private health systems. Australia has reciprocal health care agreements with 11 other nations, covering the cost of medically necessary care when Australians visit certain countries, and visitors from these countries visit Australia.

History

2005 restructure
Queensland Health was restructured toward the end of 2005 from 38 "health districts" to 20. There were a number consolidations particularly in the urban areas with the formation of the "Northside" and "Southside" Districts. Northside District included three major hospital facilities including The Prince Charles Hospital, Redcliffe and Caboolture Hospitals while Southside brought the Logan, Redlands, Beaudesert and Queen Elizabeth II Jubilee Hospitals together. Due to their size and areas they covered, the Royal Brisbane and Women's Hospital (RBWH) on the Northside, and the Princess Alexandra Hospital or regional centre on the Southside remained independent entities or Districts in their own right.

In September 2008, the 20 health service districts were further reduced to 15. According to a Queensland Health media release, nine districts remain unchanged. The unchanged districts were: Central Queensland, Townsville, Mackay, Cairns, Torres Strait, Cape York, Mount Isa, Central West and South West Districts. Six new districts were created:
Darling Downs-West Moreton incorporating the former Toowoomba and Darling Downs and West Moreton South Burnett districts.
Sunshine Coast-Wide Bay incorporating the Sunshine Coast – Cooloola, Wide Bay and Fraser Coast health service districts.
Metro South incorporates the Southside Health Service District and Princess Alexandra Hospital.
Metro North incorporates the Northside Health Service District and Royal Brisbane and Women's Hospital.
Children's Health Services, will oversee the implementation of a state-wide paediatric service.

Health Quality and Complaints Commission
In response to the Forster Review of Queensland Health Systems an independent Health Quality and Complaints Commission was established on 1 July 2006 to allow patients to lodge complaints about health matters.

The (full-time) Commissioner is Professor Michael Ward, a former Professor of Medicine at the University of Queensland.  There are also a number of part-time Assistant Commissioners.  
 
The Health Quality and Complaints Commission also has a role in the development and implementation of quality, safety and clinical practice standards throughout Queensland's public and private services and monitor best practice clinical governance and patient safety.

It was subject to review by an all-party Parliamentary Committee after its first full year of operation.

The HQCC has since been replaced by the Office of the Health Ombudsman.

Proposed abolition
Former Premier Anna Bligh announced on 12 December 2011 that the department would be dismantled.  The decision was attributed to an "unacceptable culture", the theft of $16 million from the department and problems with the payroll system which has cost hundreds of millions of dollars. The department was due to cease operations on 1 July 2012.

In January 2012, more details of the reform plan were announced, with an emphasis on health care management to be done locally. Bligh described the changes as the biggest decentralisation of the public sector in the state's history. In March 2012, the ALP lost power in Queensland and the proposed abolition of Queensland Health did not eventuate.

2012 restructure
Following Queensland's agreement to participate in National Health Care Reform in 2011, an Australian Health Care Agreement was signed that required the creation of local hospital networks that would be directly funded by the Commonwealth. In May 2012 legislation was proposed by Lawrence Springborg to formalise the conversion of the health districts created in the 2005 restructure to independent local Hospital and Health Services (HHS'). Under the new arrangements, each HHS would have their own board to manage and oversee health operations in that region.  The boards are accountable to the minister for health, and a "system manager" was established to provide oversight and support to each of the services. These changes became effective on 1 July 2012.

Hospital and Health Services
The Health and Hospital Services are independent statutory bodies which are responsible for delivering public health services in their areas. Each HHS is governed by a Hospital and Health Board and managed by a Health Service Chief Executive. There are 15 regional HHS', and one state-wide HHS (Children's Health Queensland). The regional HHS' are:

Cairns and Hinterland
Central Queensland
Central West
Darling Downs
Gold Coast
Mackay
Metro North
Metro South
North West
South West
Sunshine Coast
Torres and Cape
Townsville
West Moreton
Wide Bay

Children's Health Queensland (CHQ) operates the Queensland Children's Hospital, as well as provides specialist advice to health practitioner in Queensland via telehealth, and runs paediatric public health programs throughout the state like the Good Start Program and school-based nursing services. Children from anywhere across Queensland can be referred to CHQ, and can receive specialist care at Queensland Children's Hospital.

As not all HHS' are able to provide advanced care services, largely due to the size and remoteness of its catchment and population, some HHS (primarily Metro North and Metro South) accept referrals from outside their catchment where the service cannot be provided locally. To assist with this, Queensland has a Patient Travel Subsidy Scheme which covers reasonable costs of transport and accommodation to another public facility if it cannot be provided locally.

Criticism

Jayant Patel scandal

 
Queensland Health and the Bundaberg Base Hospital were involved in a scandal surrounding the employment of surgeon Jayant Patel.  The Queensland Medical Board approved his registration and he was then quickly promoted to Director of Surgery even though he lacked specific qualifications.

In March 2005, Rob Messenger raised concerns with Patel's medical practices in the Queensland Parliament after he was contacted by senior hospital nurse Toni Hoffman. Hoffman received the Order of Australia medal and 2006 Australian of the Year Local Hero Award for her role as a whistleblower.

An inquiry into the matter known as the Morris Inquiry was started but was terminated on the grounds of perceived bias. A second inquiry known as the Davies Inquiry found that the Queensland Health district manager and the hospital's Director of Medical Services had mostly ignored more than 20 complaints regarding Patel.
Sentence
On 1 July 2010, Patel was sentenced to seven years' jail after he was found guilty of three charges of manslaughter and one count of grievous bodily harm. Patel appealed his conviction and sentence to the Court of Appeal, his appeal was dismissed.

Patel then appealed the Court of Appeal's decision to the High Court of Australia, and was granted special leave to appeal. On 24 August 2012, the High Court unanimously allowed the appeal and quashed Patel's convictions on the ground that prejudicial evidence had likely influenced the jury. The High Court granted Patel a new trial.
Retrial, acquittal, plea bargain
The following year, a retrial was held for one of the manslaughter charges, and Patel was acquitted by the jury.  The remaining manslaughter and grievous bodily harm charges were later dropped in exchange for Patel pleading guilty to two counts related to him dishonestly gaining registration and two counts related to dishonestly gaining employment in Queensland. Patel was sentenced to a two-year suspended sentence for those fraud charges.
Medical ban
On 15 May 2015, the Queensland Civil and Administrative Tribunal banned Patel from ever practising medicine in Australia again.

Payroll problems
In April 2010, it was revealed that many Queensland Health staff were experiencing incorrect payment of wages since the introduction of a new payroll system. The WorkBrain/SAP was a new system which replaced the LATTICE system. It went live in March 2010, without adequate testing and despite warnings from SAP and IBM.

The problem was not resolved by May, with 35,000 wage anomalies to be fixed, but some progress had been made.  The State was advised that it could sue IBM for damages totaling $88M. On 23 November 2010, the Queensland government announced that a negotiated settlement with IBM will spend $209 million over three years to resolve payroll problems.

The system is very labor-intensive and requires ten times the staff as other systems. It is estimated to cost $1.2B before 2018 when it is recommended to be replaced. According to the 2013 Commission of Inquiry, "the QH payroll system must take a place in the front rank of failures in public administration in this country".

Payroll System Commission of Inquiry
The Queensland Health Payroll System Commission of Inquiry (QHPSCI) was established by order of the Governor in Council on 13 December 2012. The Honourable Richard Chesterman AO RFD QC commenced the Inquiry on 1 February 2013. In his remarks at the directions hearing, Commissioner Chesterman explained the purpose of the inquiry "is to determine why such large amounts of money have been lost to the public, whether anything might be recovered; and why such distress was inflicted on the Queensland Health workforce."

QHPSCI's public hearings began on Monday 11 March 2013 with phase one focusing on the "Tender Process". The second phase, examining the 'Contract' with IBM, commenced on 22 April 2013. The third and final phase, "Settlement", began on Monday 27 May 2013. The former Premier and two ex-ministers were called to give evidence during this phase.   A special hearing was held on the 18 June 2013 to deal with late information submitted to the Commission. The QHPSCI presented its findings to the Premier on 31 July 2013.

Fake Tahitian Prince
One of Queensland Health's employees, New Zealander Joel Barlow, pretended that he was also a Tahitian Prince. During his time working in the finance department, he embezzled millions. His fake story was discovered and he was jailed. In 2020, his visa was cancelled and was sent back to New Zealand.

See also

Biosecurity in Australia
Health care in Australia
Queensland Ambulance Service

References
Notes

Citations

External links
Queensland Health
Queensland Health Payroll System Commission of Inquiry

Health
Medical and health organisations based in Queensland
Queensland